"Bad Life" is a song by Norwegian pop singer Sigrid and British rock band Bring Me the Horizon. It was written by Sigrid Raabe, Oliver Sykes and Jordan Fish and produced by Zakk Cervini and Evil Twin. It was released as the fourth single from Sigrid's second studio album How to Let Go.

Composition and lyrics
Originally written by Oliver Sykes and Jordan Fish for Bring Me the Horizon's Post Human: Survival Horror, the band decided that "Bad Life" wasn't appropriate for the record and decided to shelve the song. The band met Sigrid Raabe backstage at the Reading and Leeds Festival in 2021, finding out they were both a fan of each other's music. They felt like the song would be more appropriate for her style of music and offered her the song. Raabe accepted and rewrote the song and asked Sykes to collaborate on the track with her.

"Bad Life" is a pop and a pop rock song. It was written in the key of E major and runs at 95 BPM, composed by Raabe, Sykes and Fish while it was produced by Zakk Cervini and Evil Twin.

Speaking about "Bad Life", Raabe elaborated: "It tells the story of when things are rough and it can feel like you're never going to stop feeling sad."

Track listing

Music video
The music video for "Bad Life" was unveiled and published onto YouTube alongside the single on 21 April 2022 and was directed by Raja Virdi.

It is a one-shot video that stars Raabe and Sykes on each side of a worn-down house surrounded by a river performing the song.

Talking about the music video, Raabe explains:

Speaking about the making of the video, director Raja Virdi went on to say:

Personnel
Credits adapted from Tidal.

Musicians
 Sigrid Raabe – lead vocals, composition, lyrics 
 Oliver Sykes – lead vocals, composition, lyrics
 Jordan Fish – keyboards, programming, backing vocals, composition, lyrics
 Lee Malia – guitars
 Matt Kean – bass
 Matt Nicholls – drums

Additional personnel
 Zakk Cervini – producer
 Mark "Spike" Stent – mixing, studio personnel 
 Evil Twin – producer
 John Greenham – mastering engineer, studio personnel
 Andrea Mastroiacovo – recording engineer, studio personnel

Charts

Weekly charts

Year-end charts

References

2022 singles
2022 songs
Sigrid (singer) songs
Bring Me the Horizon songs
Songs written by Sigrid (singer)
Songs written by Oliver Sykes
Island Records singles
Pop rock songs